Padampur is a City and a municipality, just 39 km from Sri Ganganagar city in Sri Ganganagar District in the Indian state of Rajasthan. The city was named after Rajkumar Padam Singh of royal family of Bikaner.

Geography
Located in southwest of the Ganganagar district, the city has an average elevation of 

There is no direct railway link to the city. There is 132 KV grid substation which is being upgraded to 220 KV near the village. The public transport system of the Rajasthan Government provides basic transportation facility to the people.

Demographics

Padampur had a population of about 163000. Males constitute 53% of the population and females 47%. Padampur has an average literacy rate of 64%, higher than the national average of 59.5%: male literacy is 70%.

The demographics of Padampur show evidence of a large and ethnically diverse people.  The area is mostly inhabited by Hindus and Sikhs. Major languages spoken are Punjabi and Bagri. The area continues to be the gateway for legal work for the nearby villages.  the area has been categorized in 20 wards circle headed by ward member of that area selected by the residents of the ward.

Economy

Following the construction of the Ganges Canal (Rajasthan), the main occupation of near by villages is agriculture, which is also the basis of the city's economy. The main crops are wheat, mustard and cotton while other crops includes guar, bajra, sugar cane and grams. In recent years, kinnow (a hybrid citrus fruit derived from the "orange") has also gained prominence with farmers. The industries in the city are mostly based on agriculture. The people of the town are involved in their family businesses.

Climate

The climate of Padampur varies to extreme limits. The average temperature in summer reaches around 41° Celsius and in winter around 26 °C. The temperature shots up to 50° in June. The average annual rainfall is only 200 mm (7.9 in) per annum. Lack of rain and irrigation affect the income of farmers of the villages of Padampur.

References

Cities and towns in Sri Ganganagar district